Qinarjeh-ye Olya (also Romanized as Qīnarjeh-ye ‘Olyā; also known as Qanīzjeh-ye ‘Olyā) is a village in Charuymaq-e Jonubesharqi Rural District, Shadian District, Charuymaq County, East Azerbaijan Province, Iran. At the 2006 census, its population was 69, in 13 families.

References 

Populated places in Charuymaq County